Joshua Kevin Phelps (born 10 February 1993) is an Australian footballer who plays as a defender for Melbourne Knights in the NPL Victoria.

Career

Professional
After two seasons with the Tormenta in the PDL, Phelps became the club's first pro signing in September 2018. He made his professional debut for the club on 29 March 2019 in a 1–0 home victory over the Greenville Triumph. In December 2021, he signed a two-year contract extension with the club.

In early December 2022 it was announced Phelps would return to Australia to join NPL Victoria side Melbourne Knights ahead of their 2023 season, signing for an undisclosed fee.

References

External links 
 
 Josh Phelps - Men's Soccer - UNCP Athletics

1993 births
Living people
Australian soccer players
Australian expatriate soccer players
Australian expatriate sportspeople in the United States
Association football defenders
Expatriate soccer players in the United States
People from Tamworth, New South Wales
Tormenta FC players
USL League One players
USL League Two players
Thomas College alumni
Sportsmen from New South Wales
Soccer players from New South Wales
Melbourne Knights FC players